Anderson Summit is, at , the highest peak in the Thiel Mountains of Antarctica in Ellsworth Land, on top of the Ford Massif and directly southeast of Walker Spur. It is snow-covered except for bare rock at the top. The name was proposed by Peter Bermel and Arthur Ford, co-leaders of the United States Geological Survey (USGS) Thiel Mountains party, 1960–61. The peak was climbed by Ford in 1961. It was named for Charles A. Anderson, then chief geologist of the USGS.

See also
 Mountains in Antarctica

References
 

Mountains of Ellsworth Land